Earl Cornelius Latourette (February 10, 1889 – August 18, 1956) was the 32nd Chief Justice of the Oregon Supreme Court and a Clackamas County Circuit Court judge. He served as chief justice for two years and died while still in office as a justice in 1956.

Early life
Latourette was born in Oregon City, Oregon, on February 10, 1889, to Charles David Latourette and his wife Sedonia Bird Shaw Latourette. Both parents were pioneer settlers to Oregon. He had three brothers; Mortimer Dillon, Howard Fenton, and John Randolph. 

The LaTourette family were French Huguenots who fled persecution and settled in Staten Island, New York in the late 1600s. Family members began moving westward in the 1800s, settling in St. Louis and Michigan.  In 1879 LaTourette's father moved from Michigan to Oregon City to form a law partnership with his cousin, Dewitt Clinton Latourette.  

LaTourette attended the University of Oregon, where he was on the football and track teams. He was the quarterback on the 1910 Duck football team and scored the winning touchdown to beat what is now Oregon State University, and received All-Northwest Honors for two seasons. Following college, he enrolled at the University of Oregon School of Law, which at that time was located in Portland. He graduated in 1912, and then passed the bar in 1915. Latourette began practicing law in Oregon City after passing the bar, and remained in private practice until 1931.

Judicial career
In 1931, he was appointed as a circuit court judge for Oregon’s 5th judicial district that included Clackamas County, holding that position until 1950. During his time on the bench he lived in Oregon City, and in 1936 attended the funeral of fellow judge John Hugh McNary. Then on January 19, 1950 Oregon Governor Douglas McKay appointed Latourette to replace E. M. Page on the Oregon Supreme Court. Page had resigned from his position the day before, less than a year after he had been appointed to the court. Later that year Latourette won election to a full six-year term on the bench. Then in 1953 he was selected by his fellow justices to be Chief Justice, serving as Chief Justice until 1955. During this time as Chief Justice, future politician Norma Paulus clerked for him. Latourette encouraged her to attend law school, which she did at Willamette University College of Law. On August 18, 1956, Justice Earl Latourette died in office

Family
On April 30, 1912, Earl C. Latourette married Ruth Steiwer of Fossil, Oregon.  Ruth was the daughter of William H. Steiwer, and a member of a prominent political family from Eastern Oregon. The couple’s children included daughters Anne Latourette Cook, Jeanne Latourette Linklater and Earl C. "Neil" Latourette, Jr. (d. 1982). Earl C. later married Eleanor Marshall in 1949, and they did not have any children.

Other
The oldest house in Gearhart, Oregon belonged to the Latourette family beginning in 1926. Earl’s father Charles David Latourette later had his two sons Earl and brother John flip a coin to determine who would inherit the property with John winning the coin toss.
Justice Latourette donated the land in Oregon City where the Clackamas County Historical Society’s museum is located.

References

Politicians from Oregon City, Oregon
1956 deaths
Oregon state court judges
1889 births
Oregon Ducks football players
University of Oregon School of Law alumni
Chief Justices of the Oregon Supreme Court
20th-century American judges
Justices of the Oregon Supreme Court